Alexandria is a city in Monroe Township, Madison County, Indiana, United States. According to the 2010 census, its population was 5,145, a decrease of 17.8% from 6,260 in 2000.

History
Alexandria was platted in 1836, when it was certain that the Indiana Central Canal would be extended to that point. It was incorporated as a town in 1898.

Geography

Demographics

Alexandria is part of the Anderson, Indiana metropolitan statistical area.

2010 census
As of the census of 2010, there were 5,145 people, 2,113 households, and 1,362 families living in the city. The racial makeup of the city was 97.4% White, 0.3% African American, 0.1% Native American, 0.2% Asian, 0.8% from other races, and 1.1% from two or more races. Hispanic or Latino people of any race were 1.7% of the population.

Of the 2,113 households 33.6% had children under the age of 18 living with them, 42.2% were married couples living together, 15.7% had a female householder with no husband present, 6.6% had a male householder with no wife present, and 35.5% were non-families. 30.1% of households were one person and 12.8% were one person aged 65 or older. The average household size was 2.41 and the average family size was 2.95.

The median age was 38.2 years. 25.6% of residents were under the age of 18; 8.8% were between the ages of 18 and 24; 24.8% were from 25 to 44; 25.1% were from 45 to 64; and 15.6% were 65 or older. The gender makeup of the city was 47.8% male and 52.2% female.

2000 census
As of the census of 2000, there were 6,260 people, 2,481 households, and 1,654 families living in the city. The racial makeup of the city was 98.10% White, 0.46% Black or African American, 0.08% Native American, 0.11% Asian, 0.02% Pacific Islander, 0.43% from other races, and 0.80% from two or more races. 0.99% of the population were Hispanic or Latino of any race.

Of the 2,481 households 33.9% had children under the age of 18 living with them, 49.0% were married couples living together, 12.7% had a female householder with no husband present, and 33.3% were non-families. 28.9% of households were one person and 13.1% were one person aged 65 or older. The average household size was 2.48 and the average family size was 3.04.

The age distribution was 27.8% under the age of 18, 8.9% from 18 to 24, 28.0% from 25 to 44, 19.5% from 45 to 64, and 15.9% 65 or older. The median age was 35 years. For every 100 females, there were 91.4 males. For every 100 females age 18 and over, there were 87.4 males.

The median household income was $35,359 and the median family income  was $42,731. Males had a median income of $30,529 versus $23,384 for females. The per capita income for the city was $15,578. About 4.2% of families and 7.0% of the population were below the poverty line, including 4.1% of those under age 18 and 15.0% of those age 65 or over.

Government
The city council consists of seven members. Five members are elected from individual districts, and two are elected at large. The city is governed by a "strong" mayor system that appoints two council members and/or city residents to serve at the mayor's pleasure on the board of public works and safety. The chief financial officer is the clerk-treasurer. The clerk-treasure and mayor are full-time elected officials.

Transportation

Airport
Alexandria Airport is a public use airport located southeast of the central business district of Alexandria.

Education
Alexandria Community School Corporation operates public schools.

The town has a lending library, the Alexandria-Monroe Public Library.

Notable people

Joey Feek, country singer
Bill Gaither, gospel singer/songwriter
Danny Gaither, gospel singer
Gloria Gaither, author/lyricist, gospel singer
Charles Corydon Hall, industrialist
Robert L. Rock, politician

References

External links

City of Alexandria, Indiana website
Alexandria Chamber of Commerce

Cities in Indiana
Cities in Madison County, Indiana
Populated places established in 1836
1836 establishments in Indiana